Shirley DeLibero served as chairman and CEO of the Metropolitan Transit Authority of Harris County, Texas from 1999 until 2004.

DeLibero was previously the deputy executive of Dallas Area Rapid Transit, and executive director of New Jersey Transit.

Her tenure at Texas was marked by the introduction of the METRORail light rail transit system  Associated Press, October 29, 2000</ref>

References

Living people
Year of birth missing (living people)
Women business executives